Nabīl or Nabeel is a male given name of Arabic origin, meaning "noble". The feminine version is Nabila, Nabeela, Nabilah, Nabseela or Nabeelah. The name Nabil has a similar meaning to the English given name Patrick.

People named Nabeel

Given name

 Nabeel Abbas (born 1986), Iraqi footballer
 Nabeel Jabbour, author, lecturer, and expert on Muslim culture
 Nabeel Kassis (born 1945), Palestinian academic and politician
 Nabeel Qureshi (author) (active from 2009), American Christian apologist
 Nabeel Qureshi (director) (born 1985), Pakistani film director
 Nabeel Rajab (born 1964), Bahraini human rights and opposition activist
 Nabeel Saleh Mubarak, Bahraini modern pentathlete
 Nabeel Shaukat Ali (born 1989), Pakistani singer
 Nabeel Yasin (born 1950), Iraqi poet, journalist and political activist

Middle name
 Muhammad Nabil Al Khatib, Syrian politician

Family name
 Dada Nabeel (born 1989), Indian football player
 Nasser Nabeel (born 1990), Qatari footballer

People named Nabil 
Honorific
 Nabíl-i-Akbar (1829–1892), one of the 19 Apostles of Bahá'u'lláh
 Nabíl-i-A`zam (1831–1892), "the Great Nabíl", Bahá'í historian

Given name

 Nabil Abou-Harb (born 1984), American filmmaker, writer, producer
 Nabil Abidallah (born 1982), Dutch footballer of Moroccan descent
 Nabil Abdul Rashid (born 1987), English comedian of Nigerian descent.
 Nabil Adamou (born 1975), Algerian long jumper
 Nabil Al-Garbi (born 1993), Yemeni middle-distance runner
 Nabil Ali (1938–2016), Egyptian scientist, writer, and thinker.
 Nabil Amr (born 1947), Palestinian politician
 Nabil Anani (born 1943), Palestinian artist
 Nabil Ashoor (born 1982), Omani footballer
 Nabil Aslam (born 1984), Pakistani Danish footballer
 Nabil Ayad, founder of the Diplomatic Academy of London
 Nabil Ayers, American musician and entrepreneur
 Nabil Ayouch (born 1969), French-Moroccan television and film director, producer and writer
 Nabil Sabio Azadi (born 1991), Iranian-New Zealand artist
 Nabil Baalbaki (born 1978), Lebanese footballer
 Nabil Bahoui (born 1991), Swedish footballer of Moroccan descent
 Nabil Ben Yadir, Moroccan-Belgian actor, film director and screenwriter
 Nabil Benabdallah (born 1959), Moroccan politician and minister
 Nabil Bentaleb (born 1994), Algerian footballer
 Nabil Al Busaidi (born 1970), British adventurer
 Nabil Choueiri (born 1950), Lebanese long-distance running athlete
 Nabil Crismatt (born 1994), Colombian baseball pitcher
 Nabil Ejenavi (born 1994), Algerian footballer
 Nabil El Zhar (born 1986), Moroccan footballer, currently with Levante F.C.
 Nabil Elaraby (born 1935), Egyptian diplomat and the Secretary-General of the Arab League
 Nabil Elderkin, Australian photographer, music video and film director of mixed American / Iranian origin
 Nabil El-Nayal (born 1985), Syrian-born British fashion designer
 Nabil Elouahabi (born 1975), British Moroccan actor
 Nabil Esmail (born 1942), Egyptian chemical engineer
 Nabil Al Fadl (1949–2015), Kuwaiti politician
 Nabil Fahmi (born 1951), Egyptian diplomat and politician
 Nabil Hasan al-Faqih, Yemeni politician
 Nabil Farouk (1956–2020), Egyptian novelist
 Nabil Fekir (born 1993), French footballer
 Nabil Fiqri (born 1987), Malaysian field hocker player
 Nabil Gabol (born 1963), Pakistani politician
 Nabil Ghilas (born 1990), Algerian footballer
 Nabil Gholam, Lebanese architect
 Nabil Haddad, priest in the Melkite Greek Catholic Church and a leading figure among Arab Christians in Jordan. Founder and director of the Jordanian Interfaith Coexistence Research Center (JICRC) in Amman, Jordan
 Nabil Hemani (1979–2014), Algerian footballer
 Nabil Jaadi (born 1996), Belgian footballer of Moroccan origin
 Nabil Jeffri (born 1993), Malaysian racing driver
 Nabil Kassel (born 1984), Algerian boxer
 Nabil Kebbab (born 1983), Algerian swimmer
 Nabil Kochaji (born 1975), Syrian author, novelist and medical researcher
 Nabil Lasmari (born 1978), Algerian badminton player
 Nabil Maâloul (born 1962), Tunisian footballer and football coach
 Nabil Madi (born 1981), Algerian middle distance runner
 Nabil Maleh (1936–2016), Syrian film director, screenwriter, producer, painter and poet
 Nabil Miskinyar (born 1948), Afghan TV host who currently runs a TV channel from United States called Ariana
 Nabil Nahas (born 1949), Lebanese New York-based artist and painter
 Nabil Neghiz, Algerian football manager
 Nabil Nosair (1938–2016), Egyptian footballer
 Nabil Omran (born 1981), Libyan futsal player
 Nabil Qaouk, Lebanese politician and cleric, member and deputy member of the executive council of Hezbollah
 Nabil Sahli (born 1978), better known by his stage name Nessbeal, French rapper
 Nabil Sahraoui (1966–2004), alias Mustapha Abou Ibrahim, Algerian Islamist militant, and the head of the radical Groupe Salafiste pour la Prédication et le Combat (GSPC, later renamed Al-Qaeda Organization in the Islamic Maghreb) from August 2003 until his death in 2004
 Nabil Salameh, also known as Nabil or Nabil Bey, Palestinian Lebanese-born singer, songwriter, musician, artist and journalist, founder of the world music bands Radiodervish and Al Darawish.
 Nabil Samad (born 1986), Bangladeshi cricketer
 Nabil Sawalha, Jordanian comedian
 Nabil Seidah (born 1949), Egyptian born Canadian Québécois scientist
 Nabil Shaath (born 1938), Palestinian official, chief negotiator and cabinet minister
 Nabil Shaban (born 1953), Jordanian-British actor and writer
 Nabil Al Shahmeh (born 1974), Syrian footballer
 Nabil Talhouni, Jordanian Ambassador of the Hashemite Kingdom of Jordan

Family name
 Ahmed Nabil (fencer) (born 1986), Egyptian fencer
 Muhammad Nabil al-Khatib, Syrian politician
 Rahmatullah Nabil, Afghan politician, Head of the National Directorate of Security from 2010 to 2012
 Shahrun Nabil (born 1986), Malaysian field hockey player
 Youssef Nabil (born 1972), Egyptian artist and photographer

See also 
 
 
 
 
 Nabeel's Song, book by Jo Tatchell published accounting life of Iraqi poet Nabeel Yasin and his extended family
 Nabil Bank, commercial bank in Nepal

References 

Arabic masculine given names